Laurence des Cars (born Laurence Élisabeth de Pérusse des Cars on 13 June 1966) is a French general curator of heritage and art historian, since September 2021 Director of the Louvre Museum after having headed the Musée d'Orsay and Musée de l'Orangerie.

Biography 
Laurence des Cars was born in Antony, France. She is the daughter of the journalist and writer  and granddaughter of the novelist Guy des Cars (himself the second son of François de Pérusse des Cars, 5th Duc des Cars). She studied art history at Paris-Sorbonne University and École du Louvre, then joined the Institut national du patrimoine and took her first position as curator at the Musée d'Orsay in 1994.

She is a specialist on the art of the nineteenth century and early twentieth century. As a teacher at École du Louvre, she organised many exhibitions for various museums, such as 'L'Origine du monde, autour d'un chef-d'œuvre de Courbet' (Musée d'Orsay, 1996); 'Jean-Paul Laurens, peintre d'histoire' (Musée d'Orsay, Musée des Augustins, 1997–1998); 'Edward Burne-Jones' (Metropolitan Museum of Art, Birmingham Museum, Musée d'Orsay, 1998–1999); 'Courbet et la Commune' (Musée d'Orsay, 2000); 'Thomas Eakins, un réaliste américain' (Philadelphia Museum of Art, Musée d'Orsay, The Metropolitan Museum of Art, 2001–2002); 'Édouard Vuillard' (National Gallery of Art, Montreal Museum of Fine Arts, Galeries nationales du Grand Palais, Royal Academy of Arts, 2003–2004); 'Gustave Courbet' (Galeries nationales du Grand Palais, The Metropolitan Museum of Art, Musée Fabre, 2007–2008); 'Jean-Léon Gérôme' (Getty Museum, Musée d'Orsay, Thyssen-Bornemisza Museum, 2010–2011); 'Louvre Abou Dhabi, Naissance d'un musée' (Manarat Al Saadiyat Museum, Musée du Louvre, 2013–2014); 'Attaquer le soleil : Hommage au marquis de Sade' (Musée d'Orsay, 2014–2015); 'Apollinaire, le regard du poète' (Musée de l'Orangerie, 2016); 'La peinture américaine des années 1930' (Musée de l'Orangerie, 2016–2017).

She is the author of numerous illustrated essays, including a book on Pre-Raphaelites for the collection 'Découvertes Gallimard', Les Préraphaélites : Un modernisme à l'anglaise (1999); L'art français : Le XIXe siècle (Flammarion, 2008);  (RMN Grand Palais, 2013), et cetera.

She was also promoted to general curator of heritage in 2011 and was appointed director of the Musée de l'Orangerie in January 2014, by the Minister of Culture, Aurélie Filippetti. On 27 February 2017, she was officially appointed director of the Musée d'Orsay by the then French President François Hollande.

She has been appointed to assume the role of Director of the Louvre Museum from 1 September 2021, becoming the first woman to hold the position in the establishment's 228-year history.

Honours 
Laurence des Cars is a chevalier of the Legion of Honour and National Order of Merit, officer of Arts and letters.

In 1999 des Cars published a book about the Pre-Raphaelites, Les Préraphaélites : Un modernisme à l'anglaise.

Publications 
 Les Préraphaélites : Un modernisme à l'anglaise, collection « Découvertes Gallimard » (nº 368), série Arts. Éditions Gallimard, 1999
 UK edition – The Pre-Raphaelites: Romance and Realism, 'New Horizons' series. Thames & Hudson, 2000 (reprinted 2004, 2010, 2011)
 US edition – The Pre-Raphaelites: Romance and Realism, "Abrams Discoveries" series. Harry N. Abrams, 2000
 Gérôme : De la peinture à l'image, coll. « Découvertes Gallimard Hors série ». Éditions Gallimard, 2010
 Louvre Abu Dhabi : Naissance d'un musée, coll. « Catalogue d'exposition ». Louvre éditions and Éditions Flammarion, 2013
 Louvre Abu Dhabi: Birth of a Museum, Flammarion, 2014

Collective work
 AA.VV., Manet, inventeur du Moderne, « Livres d'Art ». Éditions Gallimard, 2011
 Manet: The Man Who Invented Modernity, Gallimard, 2011
 AA.VV., Apollinaire : Le regard du poète, « Livres d'Art ». Éditions Gallimard, 2016

References 

1966 births
French curators
French art historians
Knights of the Ordre national du Mérite
Chevaliers of the Légion d'honneur
École du Louvre alumni
Living people
House of Pérusse des Cars
French women curators